The 2014 Boyd Gaming 300 was the third stock car race of the 2014 NASCAR Nationwide Series season, and the 18th iteration of the event. The race was held on Saturday, March 8, 2014, in North Las Vegas, Nevada at Las Vegas Motor Speedway, a 1.5 miles (2.4 km) permanent D-shaped oval racetrack. The race took the scheduled 200 laps to complete. At race's end, Brad Keselowski, driving for Team Penske, would complete a dominant performance to win his 28th career NASCAR Nationwide Series win and his first of the season. To fill out the podium, Kyle Busch, driving for Joe Gibbs Racing, and Kyle Larson, driving for Turner Scott Motorsports, would finish second and third, respectively.

Background 

Las Vegas Motor Speedway, located in Clark County, Nevada outside the Las Vegas city limits and about 15 miles northeast of the Las Vegas Strip, is a 1,200-acre (490 ha) complex of multiple tracks for motorsports racing. The complex is owned by Speedway Motorsports, Inc., which is headquartered in Charlotte, North Carolina.

Entry list 

 (R) denotes rookie driver.
 (i) denotes driver who is ineligible for series driver points.

Practice

First practice 
The first practice session was held on Friday, March 7, at 12:40 PM PST. The session would last for 50 minutes.

Second and final practice 
The final practice session, sometimes referred to as Happy Hour, was held on Friday, March 7, at 2:00 PM PST. The session would last for one hour and 20 minutes.

Qualifying 
Qualifying was held on Saturday, March 8, at 9:40 AM PST. Since Las Vegas Motor Speedway is at least  in length, the qualifying system was a multi-car system that included three rounds. The first round was 25 minutes, where every driver would be able to set a lap within the 25 minutes. Then, the second round would consist of the fastest 24 cars in Round 1, and drivers would have 10 minutes to set a lap. Round 3 consisted of the fastest 12 drivers from Round 2, and the drivers would have 5 minutes to set a time. Whoever was fastest in Round 3 would win the pole.

No drivers would fail to qualify.

Full qualifying results 

*Time not available.

Race results

Standings after the race 

Drivers' Championship standings

Note: Only the first 10 positions are included for the driver standings.

References 

2014 NASCAR Nationwide Series
NASCAR races at Las Vegas Motor Speedway
March 2014 sports events in the United States
2014 in sports in Nevada